Fadda is a surname. Notable people with the surname include:

 Carlo Fadda (1853–1931), Italian jurist and politician
 Oswaldo Fadda (1921–2005), Brazilian jiu-jitsu practitioner